Pilattuaq (Inuktitut syllabics: ᐱᓚᑦᑐᐊᖅ) formerly Scott Island is an uninhabited island in the Qikiqtaaluk Region of Nunavut, Canada. It is located in Baffin Bay, off the eastern coast of Baffin Island, in the middle of Scott Inlet, north of the confluence of Clark Fiord and Gibbs Fiord which embrace Qikiqtaaluk.

Another, much smaller Scott Island lies off the southwest coast of Baffin Island, near the mouth of Keltie Inlet.

Geography
The island's steep and rugged cliffs reach up to  [above sea level.

One of the most notable formations on the island is The Ship's Prow, a  overhanging granite wall, first climbed by Mike Libecki in the spring of 1999.

Fauna
Glaucous gull and northern fulmar frequent its cliffs and shoreline.

References

Islands of Baffin Bay
Islands of Baffin Island
Uninhabited islands of Qikiqtaaluk Region